"De Mil Amores" is the second single of the album Gracias Por Estar Aquí. The song was written and performed by Mexican singer-songwriter Marco Antonio Solís. The song won a Latin Grammy Award for Best Regional Mexican Song at the Latin Grammy Awards of 2014.

Chart performance

References 

2013 singles
Songs written by Marco Antonio Solís
Marco Antonio Solís songs
Universal Music Latino singles
Latin Grammy Award for Best Regional Mexican Song
2013 songs